Beste Kaynakçı (born 30 April 1994) is a Turkish yacht racer. She qualified to participate at the Sailing at the 2020 Summer Olympics.

Beste Kaynakçı was born in Konak, İzmir on 30 April 1994. She began in with sailing sport in 2007. She competed in the Optimist, 420 Dinghy, and Four-Seventy classes, and won several titles in national and international competitions. She is a member of the ARM Urla Sail Club in Urla, İzmir.

She qualified to compete at the 2020 Summer Olympics in the women's two-person dinghy – 470 class event with her teammate Okyanus Arıkan. Turkey will participate for the first time in that event at the Olympics.

References

External links
 
 
 

1994 births
Living people
People from Konak
Sportspeople from İzmir
Turkish female sailors (sport)
Sailors at the 2020 Summer Olympics – 470
Olympic sailors of Turkey